Anna Dovgopoliuk (born ) is a Ukrainian female former volleyball player, playing as an outside hitter. She was part of the Ukraine women's national volleyball team.

She competed at the 2011 Women's European Volleyball Championship.

References

External links
cev.lu
Zimbio

1985 births
Living people
Ukrainian women's volleyball players
Place of birth missing (living people)